François Chaussier (2 July 1746 – 19 June 1828) was a French anatomist who was a native of Dijon. His name is associated with the Prix Chaussier (Chaussier Prize).

He studied medicine in Besançon, later returning to Dijon, where he worked as a hospital physician. During this time he performed pioneer research in the field of forensic medicine. In 1780 he became a professor of anatomy.

In 1794 he was summoned to Paris by Antoine-François Fourcroy (1755–1809), being given the responsibility of drafting a report on the establishment of learning institutions of health. This report was presented to the National Convention on 27 November 1794.

Afterwards, Chaussier remained in Paris where he became a professor at the École Polytechnique, and a chief obstetrician at the Paris Maternité, where he was a colleague of Jean-Louis Baudelocque (1745–1810). In 1822 Chaussier was elected as a member of the Académie des sciences.

Chaussier is credited for introducing a procedure for revival of "near-dead" newborns. He also performed a descriptive survey of all muscles in the human body, and developed a new system of designation for muscles. He also conducted early investigations of neuralgia.

Associated eponyms 
 "Chaussier's areola": A ring of indurated tissue surrounding the lesion of cutaneous anthrax.
 "Chaussier's line": Anteroposterior raphe of the corpus callosum.
 "Chaussier's sign": Severe pain in the epigastric region, a premonitory symptom of eclampsia.

Selected publications 
 Tables synoptiques d'anatomie (Synoptic tables of Anatomy); (1799-1816) 
 Manuel médico-légal des poisons (Handbook of poisons in forensic medicine); (1824) 
 Recueil de mémoires, consultations, et rapports sur divers objets de médecine légale (Collection of memoirs, consultations, and reports on various objects of forensic medicine); (1824) 
 Mémoire médico-légal sur la viabilité de l'enfant naissant (Memoir of forensic medicine on the viability of childbirth); (1826)

References 

 This article incorporates translated text from an equivalent article at the French Wikipedia.

 Online Medical Dictionary, Definition of Eponyms

French anatomists
French obstetricians
1746 births
1828 deaths
Physicians from Dijon
Academic staff of École Polytechnique
Burials at Père Lachaise Cemetery